Henry Gardner Sr. (1731-1782) was an American politician who served as Treasurer of the Commonwealth of Massachusetts and the Colony of Massachusetts Bay. He was appointed receiver general and treasurer in 1774 by the Provisional Congress of Massachusetts.

Gardner lived in Stow, Massachusetts and moved to Dorchester, Massachusetts in 1778.

State treasurer
Gardner served as the first Massachusetts state treasurer from 1780 to 1783.

References

State treasurers of Massachusetts
18th-century American politicians
1731 births
1782 deaths